Give it a Name, also known as GIAN (and Give It a Name Incoming in 2009), named after an At the Drive-In song, was an annual British rock music festival, normally held on the weekend nearest to the end of April. The first festival took place on 2 May 2005 at Alexandra Palace, North London. In 2006, Give it a Name became a paired, two-day festival, taking place at the MEN Arena, Manchester, and Earl's Court, London. 2007 saw the festival extend to three days and six different locations, including events for the first time in Scotland, France and Germany. The festival tended to feature post-hardcore, indie rock and alternative bands. 

Give It a Name went ahead in 2009 despite the controversy of it possibly being cancelled. Rumours were dismissed when the official Myspace page of Give It a Name was seen to contain only a countdown clock expiring on 4 February. It was then announced on 3 February that Taking Back Sunday and Enter Shikari will headline the 2 day festival over 2 venues by Kerrang!'s Myspace page and official website. In 2009, the festival underwent some slight changes, with it being scaled down from the usual arena venues to smaller sized academy venues, along with it being renamed to Give It a Name Incoming and with only 14 bands playing over the weekend. In 2010 for the first year in its history, there was no festival, only a small five band UK tour.

Give it a Name 2005

Main Stage

Give it a Name 2006

Main Stage

Second Stage

Give it a Name 2007

Main Stage 

Glasgow 29th - Juliette & The Licks

Second Stage

Give it a Name 2008 

Failsafe were  MC Lars' backing band.

Main Stage

Second Stage

Give it a Name Incoming 2009 

2009's scaled-down and renamed festival took place on 17 and 19 April at London's Brixton Academy and on 18 and 19 April at the Manchester Academy. A total of 14 bands played, with seven playing on each day on just the one stage. Tickets went on general sale on 6 February at 9am on all ticket websites across the UK.

Main Stage

Give It A Name Introduces 2010

References

Music festivals in England
Music festivals in Scotland
Music festivals in Germany
Music festivals in France
Music festivals in Austria
Punk rock festivals
Festivals in Vienna